Peter Kondrát (born 7 January 1969) is a Czech bobsledder. He competed in the four man event at the 1998 Winter Olympics.

References

External links
 

1969 births
Living people
Czech male bobsledders
Olympic bobsledders of the Czech Republic
Bobsledders at the 1998 Winter Olympics
Bobsledders at the 2002 Winter Olympics
People from Ilava
Sportspeople from the Trenčín Region